Tera Yahan Koi Nahi is a Pakistani television series produced by Momina Duraid under their production banner MD Productions. It stars Kinza Hashmi, Asad Siddiqui, Savera Nadeem, Anam Tanveer, Nadia Hussain and Farhan Ali Agha in pivotal roles.

Plot 

The plot focuses on the relationship of a mother and her daughter, and how the mother's niceness causes a rift between the daughter and mother with the daughter believing her mother is being a 'doormat'. The serial also explores the love story of old age couples.

Cast 

 Kinza Hashmi
 Asad Siddiqui
 Savera Nadeem
 Nadia Hussain
 Farhan Ali Agha
 Anam Tanveer
 Adla Khan
 Adnan Shah Tipu
 Gul-e-Rana
 Noaman Sami
 Nida Mumtaz
 Akhter Hasnain
  Ahmad Harhash

Music
The show's theme song is composed by Atif Ali, with lyrics from Sabir Zafar sung by Samra Khan.

References

External links
 Official website

2019 Pakistani television series debuts
Pakistani drama television series
Urdu-language television shows
Hum TV original programming
2020 Pakistani television series endings